Kuzegari Square is a square in southern Shiraz, Iran where Rahmat Highway and Basij Boulevard meet. It goes to Ghadir Interchange from the east.

Transportation

Streets
 Rahmat Highway
 Basij Boulevard

Buses
 Route 3
 Route 25
 Route 31
 Route 98
 Route 135

Streets in Shiraz